Super K (also known as Kiara the Brave in the United States) is a 2011 Indian animated film written by Vibha Singh and Jaspinder S. Kang and directed by Smita Maroo and Vijay S. Bhanushali. The film was produced by Smita Maroo and released by Shemaroo Entertainment.

Plot
Dreamzone is a special world in the Galaxy, ruled by the kind-hearted King Maximus with his daughter Princess Kiara. Unknown to him, his brother Dreadmus is plotting to overthrow him. Dreadmus creates Super K, a boy superhero, using the powers of all the Dreamzonians. But a goof-up causes Super K to turn out a freak in Dreadmus view, unable to control his powers, and he is deserted by Dreadmus and let his minions literally name Accidentally and Suddenly to take care Super K. Dreadmus befriends the evil Dr. Ozox, a masked alchemist who has his own sinister plan to take over Dreamzone.

Super K and his friends come together to protect Dreamzone from the evil clutches of Dr. Ozox, but at the same time, Super K has to learn to control his powers.

Characters

Release and reception 
The film was released on Yahoo! Movieplex, a feature of the Yahoo! India web site, as an exclusively online animated feature film. In 2012, it was released directly to video in the United States as Kiara the Brave, with cover art showing only princess Kiara (a secondary female character with red hair). This was considered by many to be an obvious attempt to remind consumers of the female, red-headed protagonist of Brave, a Pixar Animation Studios film set in medieval Scotland.
Upon release, the film was panned by critics.

See also
List of Indian animated feature films

References

External links 
 
 

2011 animated films
2011 films
2010s Hindi-language films
Indian animated films
Mockbuster films
Indian direct-to-video films
2011 directorial debut films
2011 direct-to-video films
Indian animated fantasy films
Indian animated speculative fiction films
2010s English-language films
2011 multilingual films
Indian multilingual films